Margaret Carpenter was a politician.

Margaret Carpenter may also refer to:

Margaret Sarah Carpenter, painter
Margaret Seymour Carpenter, writer

See also
Maggie Carpenter (disambiguation)